The Great Manchester Run (styled as the Simplyhealth Great Manchester Run for sponsorship purposes from 2017) is an annual run through Greater Manchester (namely Manchester, Trafford and Salford). It has consisted of a 10k run since it was established in 2003, and a half marathon since 2017. The 10k race is the largest of its type in Europe. Usually held in mid-May, it is the third-largest mass participation running event in the United Kingdom, behind the Great North Run and the London Marathon. It is part of the Great Run series of road races in the UK. It was formerly sponsored by Bupa (2003–2014) and Morrisons (2015).

Course
The 10k course starts and finishes in Manchester city centre. It starts on Portland Street and heads southwest, out of the city centre and down the Chester Road. After entering Trafford it leaves this road and passes Old Trafford stadium. The course loops around Trafford Park, passing the Coronation Street set and the Imperial War Museum North. It then returns to Manchester city centre along the Chester Road, finishing by the Beetham Tower in Deansgate.

The half marathon course consists of the 10k course with a 7-mile detour. The detour begins after nearly a mile, when it turns east onto the Mancunian Way. It heads down the length of the motorway section and continues for another mile along the Old Ashton Road. It then turns north and heads to the Etihad Stadium, before turning back and heading back to the point where the detour began. It then continues along the remainder of the 10k course.

2007–08
The 2007 race had an estimated 28,000 participants. Briton Jo Pavey won the women's event while Kenyan Micah Kogo won the men's, beating the UK all-comers' record by four seconds with a finishing time of 27:25 minutes. Celebrity participants included Kelly Holmes, Amir Khan and members of the cast of Coronation Street.

The following year saw almost 25,000 runners complete the course. Pavey successfully defended her title at the event while Rose Cheruiyot and Bezunesh Bekele took second and third place respectively. Austrian Günther Weidlinger took the title in the men's race. Unusual for a distance dominated by African runners, the top three finishers in the men's race (which also included Ukrainian Serhiy Lebid and Sweden's Mustafa Mohamed) were all European competitors.

2009 and Great City Games

The race was upgraded to IAAF Gold Label Road Race status and the 2009 edition was expanded to include the Great City Games. Around 33,000 runners signed up for the 10 kilometres race and both events were contested on 17 May.

Previous 10 km winner Haile Gebrselassie stated that he wanted to regain his UK All-Comers' record, which was broken by Micah Kogo's event winning run in 2007. Despite a strong first half of the race, Gebrselassie failed to break the record after he was impeded by wet and windy conditions. Vivian Cheruiyot won the women's race in 32:01 minutes but conditions also slowed her time, much to her dissatisfaction. Brian Alldis and Shelly Woods won their respective men's and women's wheelchair races.

The addition of The Great City Games brought much attention to the Great Run event. Comprising a number of 150 metres races to be run on the streets near Manchester's Deansgate, Olympic Champions Usain Bolt and Christine Ohuruogu accepted invitations to compete. Other competitors included Debbie Ferguson-McKenzie, Ivory Williams, British Olympians Marlon Devonish and Donna Fraser, and a number of other British and Jamaican athletes. Bolt suffered minor leg injuries after crashing his car near Kingston, Jamaica, but after cancelling a track meet and resuming training he stated that he would be fit to compete. Bolt completed the distance in a world best time of 14.35 seconds while Ferguson-McKenzie won the women's race in 16.54 seconds.

Past winners (10K)
Key:

References
General
Tergat and Adere win inaugural Great Manchester Run. IAAF (2003-05-26). Retrieved on 2009-10-26.
Powell, David (2004-05-24). O'Sullivan underlines her Olympic claims. The Times. Retrieved on 2009-10-26.
Tadesse and Adere win, as numerous national 10km records fall in Manchester. IAAF (2006-05-21). Retrieved on 2009-10-26.
Specific

External links

Great Manchester Run website

10K runs
Sports competitions in Manchester
Athletics competitions in England
Recurring sporting events established in 2003
Athletics in Greater Manchester
2003 establishments in England
Annual sporting events in the United Kingdom
Annual events in England